{{DISPLAYTITLE:C6H12N2O4}}
The molecular formula C6H12N2O4 (molar mass: 176.17 g/mol, exact mass: 176.0797 u) may refer to:

 DMDNB
 Ethylenediaminediacetic acid (EDDA)